Scientex Berhad was established in 1968 as Scientific Textile Industries Sendirian Berhad and pioneered the manufacturing of polyvinyl chloride (PVC) leather cloth and sheeting. Scientex is now one of the top producers of stretch film and a leading player in the flexible plastic packaging industry, as well as a reputable developer of affordable yet quality homes in Malaysia.
 
Scientex has diversified its activities into other industries such as manufacturing and distribution of automotive components, and industrial packaging products. Scientex has also entered into property development in Johor, Melaka, Negeri Sembilan, Selangor, Perak, Penang, and Kedah,  all in Malaysia.

Subsidiaries

Manufacturing
Scientex Packaging Film Sdn Bhd
Scientex Tsukasa Strapping Sdn Bhd
Scientex Great Wall Sdn Bhd
Scientex Great Wall (Klang) Sdn Bhd (formerly known as Klang Hock Plastic Industries Sdn Bhd)
Scientex Great Wall (Ipoh) Sdn Bhd (formerly known as Mondi Ipoh Sdn Bhd)
Scientex Industries Group Sdn Bhd
Scientex Tsukasa (Vietnam) Co., Ltd.
PT. Scientex Indonesia
Scientex Phoenix, LLC
Scientex International (S) Pte Ltd
MCTI Scientex Solar Sdn Bhd
Mitsui Chemicals Scientex (M) Sdn Bhd
Scientex Packaging (Ayer Keroh) Berhad (formerly known as Daibochi Berhad)
Scientex Packaging (Teluk Emas) Sdn Bhd (formerly known as Mega Printing and Packaging Sdn Bhd)
Daibochi Packaging (Myanmar) Co. Ltd.

Property
Scientex Quatari Sdn Bhd
Scientex Park (M) Sdn Bhd
Scientex (Skudai) Sdn Bhd
Scientex Heights Sdn Bhd
Scientex (Senai) Sdn Bhd
Texland Sdn Bhd
KC Contract Sdn Bhd 
Scientex Rawang Sdn Bhd

References 

1968 establishments in Malaysia
Companies listed on Bursa Malaysia
Property companies of Malaysia